Antonio Palma (born 3 January 1994) is an Italian footballer who plays as a midfielder for Serie D club Alcione.

Club career
Palma began his career on Atalanta's youth categories, and was promoted to main squad for 2012–13 season, receiving the no. 94 jersey.

On 12 May 2013, Palma made his professional debut, in a 1–2 away loss against Udinese, after came off the bench to replace Ivan Radovanović in 71st minute. It was his maiden appearance in the competition.

On 3 August 2013, Palma was loaned to Nocerina. Still owned by La Dea, he represented Como and Cittadella also in temporary deals.

On 15 January 2019, he joined Rimini on loan.

On 2 October 2021, he signed for Imolese.

On 1 July 2022, Palma moved to Alcione in Serie D.

International career
On 16 November 2012, he was called up for Italy U19's. He made his debut on the 21st, and scored the second of a 4–0 routing over Czech Republic.

References

External links

 Antonio Palma National Team Stats at FIGC.it

1994 births
Living people
Sportspeople from Monza
Footballers from Lombardy
Italian footballers
Association football midfielders
Serie A players
Serie B players
Serie C players
Atalanta B.C. players
A.S.G. Nocerina players
Como 1907 players
A.S. Cittadella players
FeralpiSalò players
S.S. Juve Stabia players
S.S. Teramo Calcio players
A.C. Renate players
A.S. Giana Erminio players
Rimini F.C. 1912 players
Piacenza Calcio 1919 players
U.S. 1913 Seregno Calcio players
Imolese Calcio 1919 players
Italy youth international footballers